Blackbird Caye Airstrip  is an airstrip serving Turneffe Atoll, an atoll  off the coast of Belize. Blackbird Caye is on the eastern side of the atoll, and the airstrip runs along the shore. Approach and departure are over the water.

See also

Transport in Belize
List of airports in Belize

References

External links 
Aerodromes in Belize - pdf

Airports in Belize
Corozal District